Sutley Peak is a rock peak in Antarctica  located just north of Wright Peak and  east-northeast of Miller Crag in the Jones Mountains. It was mapped by the University of Minnesota Jones Mountains Party of 1960/61. It was named by the Advisory Committee on Antarctic Names (US-ACAN) for Lieutenant Commander Robert M. Sutley of the U.S. Navy, an executive officer of Mobile Construction Battalion One on U.S. Navy Operation Deepfreeze in 1962.

Mountains of Ellsworth Land